Reghaïa is a town and commune in Algeria.

It may also refer to: 
 Raid on Reghaïa (1837), a battle during French conquest of Algeria.
 Reghaïa River, a river in Algeria.